Psidium rostratum is a species of tree in the family Myrtaceae. It is endemic to Peru and considered as a vulnerable species by the IUCN. This species can attain a height of 10 meters.

References

Trees of Peru
rostratum
Vulnerable plants
Taxonomy articles created by Polbot